Uranothauma lukwangule is a butterfly in the family Lycaenidae. It is found in the southern Uluguru Mountains of Tanzania.

References

Endemic fauna of Tanzania
Butterflies described in 1987
Uranothauma